Dual cone and polar cone are closely related concepts in convex analysis, a branch of mathematics.

Dual cone

In a vector space 

The dual cone C of a subset C in a linear space X over the reals, e.g. Euclidean space Rn, with dual space X is the set

where  is the duality pairing between X and X, i.e. .

C is always a convex cone, even if C is neither convex nor a cone.

In a topological vector space 

If X is a topological vector space over the real or complex numbers, then the dual cone of a subset C ⊆ X is the following set of continuous linear functionals on X:

,

which is the polar of the set -C. 
No matter what C is,  will be a convex cone. 
If C ⊆ {0} then .

In a Hilbert space (internal dual cone) 

Alternatively, many authors define the dual cone in the context of a real Hilbert space (such as Rn equipped with the Euclidean inner product) to be what is sometimes called the internal dual cone.

Using this latter definition for C, we have that when C is a cone, the following properties hold:
 A non-zero vector y is in C if and only if both of the following conditions hold: 
y is a normal at the origin of a hyperplane that supports C. 
y and C lie on the same side of that supporting hyperplane.
C is closed and convex.
 implies .
If C has nonempty interior, then C is pointed, i.e. C* contains no line in its entirety.
If C is a cone and the closure of C is pointed, then C has nonempty interior.
C is the closure of the smallest convex cone containing C (a consequence of the hyperplane separation theorem)

Self-dual cones 

A cone C in a vector space X is said to be self-dual if X can be equipped with an inner product ⟨⋅,⋅⟩ such that the  internal dual cone relative to this inner product is equal to C. 
Those authors who define the dual cone as the internal dual cone in a real Hilbert space usually say that a cone is self-dual if it is equal to its internal dual. 
This is slightly different from the above definition, which permits a change of inner product. 
For instance, the above definition makes a cone in Rn with ellipsoidal base self-dual, because the inner product can be changed to make the base spherical, and a cone with spherical base in Rn is equal to its internal dual.

The nonnegative orthant of Rn and the space of all positive semidefinite matrices are self-dual, as are the cones with ellipsoidal base (often called "spherical cones", "Lorentz cones", or sometimes "ice-cream cones"). 
So are all cones in R3 whose base is the convex hull of a regular polygon with an odd number of vertices. 
A less regular example is the cone in R3 whose base is the "house": the convex hull of a square and a point outside the square forming an equilateral triangle (of the appropriate height) with one of the sides of the square.

Polar cone 

For a set C in X, the polar cone of C is the set

It can be seen that the polar cone is equal to the negative of the dual cone, i.e. Co = −C.

For a closed convex cone C in X, the polar cone is equivalent to the polar set for C.

See also 

 Bipolar theorem
 Polar set

References

Bibliography

  

  

Convex analysis
Convex geometry
Linear programming